James Hernandez Deakin (born 27 October 1972), better known as James Deakin, is a Filipino-British television and events host, automotive journalist, video blogger, and motoring editor working for CNN Philippines and Philippine Tatler.

Biography
Deakin was born on 27 October 1972 in Manila, Philippines to a British father and a Filipino mother. He has two brothers, Patrick and Michael.

Deakin currently works as the motoring editor for Philippine Tatler, a luxury-lifestyle magazine company. 

Deakin started working in CNN Philippines since 2014 with his shows Drive and The Service Road, and also hosts New Day every Friday on the same network.

Personal life
Deakin has a wife named Shelley, from New Zealand, with whom he has three children.

On February 14, 2023, he posted a photo on social media indicating he is currently dating social influencer, Roxy Delevin, who is 20 years younger than him.  It is understood that he is separated from his wife although no details have emerged on whether this has been finalized at court.

References

1972 births
Living people
CNN people
Filipino bloggers
Filipino editors
Filipino people of British descent
Filipino television personalities